Manganese(II) telluride is an inorganic compound with the chemical formula MnTe.

Properties
Manganese(II) telluride is anti-ferromagnetic and has a Néel temperature of 307 K.

Preparation
It can be produced by the fusion of manganese and tellurium in a vacuum.

References

Manganese(II) compounds
Tellurides
Nickel arsenide structure type